Christian Lali Kake Karembeu (born 3 December 1970) is a French former professional footballer who played as a defensive midfielder. He is currently the sporting director for Olympiacos.

Karembeu represented Nantes, Sampdoria, Real Madrid, Middlesbrough, Olympiacos, Servette, and Bastia. He found much success on the national stage as well representing France, having been born in the overseas territory New Caledonia, and was a vital part of the squad that won the 1998 FIFA World Cup on home soil and featured in one match in France's victorious UEFA Euro 2000 campaign.

Early life
Karembeu was born in Lifou, New Caledonia, a French overseas territory in the Pacific Islands. He played youth football for Nouméa-based FC Naitcha. At the age of 17, he moved to France on a scholarship to study and play football.

Club career
During his career Karembeu played for Nantes (1990–95), Sampdoria (1995–97), Real Madrid (1997–2000), Middlesbrough (2000–01), Olympiacos (2001–04), Servette Genève (2004–05), Bastia (2005–06). With Real Madrid, he won the Champions League in 1998 and 2000, starting in the former but remaining on the bench for the latter. He also played for the Real Madrid Veterans against Barcelona in Qatar, on 13 November 2012. He last played midfield for Bastia in the French Ligue 1. He announced his retirement on 13 October 2006, although he added that he would "be having a kickabout from time to time". He also took part in a friendly competition for Kettering Town FC with Gianfranco Zola, Les Ferdinand and Gus Poyet.

International career
Born in the French territory of New Caledonia, he was able to represent France on the international stage. He compiled 53 caps in his career, earning his first one on 14 November 1992 against Finland in a 2–1 victory.

Karembeu was a member of the French team that won the 1998 World Cup. He played in 4 matches in the tournament, including starts in the quarter-final, semi-final, and final, totalling 242 minutes.

He was also part of the victorious French team at Euro 2000.

Style of play
Described as a "complete midfielder" by Paul Sarahs of FourFourTwo, Karembeu was a physically imposing, energetic, and technically gifted two-way midfielder, who was known for his range of passing, dribbling skills, stamina, and hard-tackling playing style; he usually played in a holding role in midfield, although he was also capable of playing in various other positions, including in a box-to-box role, as a right–sided midfielder, or even as a right-back. Regarding his playing style and role in France's victory in the 1998 World Cup final, Michael Cox of ESPN FC described him as "a peculiar hybrid of a wing-back and a box-to-box midfielder," who "shuttled up and down on the right of a very defensive three-man midfield."

Post-retirement career
On 9 December 2005, Karembeu represented the Oceania Football Confederation at the draw for the 2006 World Cup which took place in Leipzig, Germany.

In May 2006 Karembeu became a scout for English Premiership side Portsmouth Football Club. In 2007, he was appointed as non-executive director of Birmingham International Holdings. He left after 2010 annual general meeting. However, in August 2009, Karembeu decided to join Arsenal's ever expanding scouting network.

In June 2013, Karembeu was handed an administrative role at Greek club Olympiacos along with former South African footballer Pierre Issa.

Commitment
Karembeu is a member of the 'Champions for Peace' club, a group of 54 famous elite athletes committed to serving peace in the world through sport, created by Peace and Sport, a Monaco-based international organization.

Deeply involved in Peace and Sport's activities, Karembeu visited Haiti in August 2010 with Founder and President of Peace and Sport, Joel Bouzou, to strengthen the role of sport in the country's reconstruction efforts and attract the attention of the international community to urgent needs that prevail there. He went to meet sports instructors and young beneficiaries of the emergency program that the Haitian Olympic Committee has set up in survivor camps.

Personal life
The great-grandfather of Karembeu, who came from New Caledonia, was one of a hundred Kanaks taken to Paris in 1931 for the Paris Colonial Exposition and exhibited there as "cannibals". Later the "cannibals" were swapped with Germany for some crocodiles. Karembeu refuses to sing France's national anthem, La Marseillaise, due to the colonial past of the country.

Karembeu was married to Slovak model Adriana Sklenařiková, whom he met on an aeroplane. The couple split in March 2011 and divorced in December 2012. Their marriage was childless. 
In May 2017, Karembeu married Jackie Chamoun, a Lebanese skier, in Greece, followed by a wedding ceremony in Lebanon. The couple announced the birth of their daughter on 27 September 2017.

Following the 1998 World Cup, he was made a Knight of the Legion of Honour in 1998.

Television
Karembeu is the host of French TV series "Des Iles et des Hommes" (Of Islands and Men), aired on Planete in 2010 and 2011, a travel programme visiting among 6 of the most beautiful islands of the world. 
He also became part of the ITV broadcast team for Euro 2016.

Career statistics

Club

International

Honours
Nantes
Division 1: 1994–95
Coupe de France runner-up: 1992–93

Real Madrid
UEFA Champions League: 1997–98, 1999–2000

Olympiacos
Alpha Ethniki: 2001–02, 2002–03
Greek Cup runner-up: 2001–02, 2003–04

France
FIFA World Cup: 1998
UEFA European Championship: 2000
FIFA Confederations Cup: 2001

Individual
Oceania Footballer of the Year: 1995, 1998
UNFP 20 Year Special Team Trophy: 2011
Olympiacos Golden Eleven

Orders
Knight of the Legion of Honour: 1998

References

External links

 
 

Chevaliers of the Légion d'honneur
French footballers
New Caledonian footballers
France international footballers
Association football midfielders
SC Bastia players
Servette FC players
Olympiacos F.C. players
Expatriate footballers in Greece
FC Nantes players
Middlesbrough F.C. players
U.C. Sampdoria players
Serie A players
La Liga players
Real Madrid CF players
1998 FIFA World Cup players
FIFA World Cup-winning players
UEFA Euro 1996 players
UEFA Euro 2000 players
UEFA European Championship-winning players
2001 FIFA Confederations Cup players
FIFA Confederations Cup-winning players
1970 births
Living people
Premier League players
Portsmouth F.C. non-playing staff
Ligue 1 players
Super League Greece players
Swiss Super League players
Expatriate footballers in Italy
Expatriate footballers in Spain
Expatriate footballers in England
Expatriate footballers in Switzerland
French expatriate footballers
French expatriate sportspeople in Italy
French expatriate sportspeople in Spain
French expatriate sportspeople in England
French expatriate sportspeople in Greece
French expatriate sportspeople in Switzerland
People from the Loyalty Islands
French people of New Caledonian descent
Black French sportspeople
Kanak people